is a 2004 Japanese pink film (softcore pornographic theatrical film) directed by Shinya Nishimura. It was the second film in Eurospace's "Eros Bancho" series.

Plot
Satoshi Minagawa (Kanji Tsuda), an office worker, seems normal but is in fact a violent porn movie fan. Nao Aiba (Rubi Aiba), a high school student, roams around town instead of going to school. Sayuri Maejima (Shion Machida) is unemployed and her brother Kou grows magic mushrooms for sale. Satoshi has a crush on Sayuri but his preparations to introduce himself are a little odd (Employs Nao to stalk Sayuri).

References

External links

2000s Japanese-language films
2004 films
2000s Japanese films